The Dominica national football team represents Dominica in international football under the control of the Dominica Football Association (DFA). Although a Dominica representative team had played previously, the football association was founded in 1970. It became fully affiliated to FIFA and CONCACAF in 1994.

The following list contains all results of Dominica's official matches.

Pre-CONCACAF

1990

1992

1993

Official

1994

1995

1996

1997

1998

1999

2000

2001

2004

2005

2006

2008

2009

2010

2011

2012

2013

2014

2015

2016

2017

2018

2019

2021

2022

2023

References

External links 
ELO Ratings List of Matches
RSSSF List of Matches
National Football Teams List of Matches
Soccerway List of Matches

Results